X34 may refer to:

ANSI X3.4-1967, an update of the ASCII character-encoding scheme
Orbital Sciences X-34, low-cost testbed which could be integrated into the Reusable Launch Vehicle program
RFA Aldersdale (X34), Dale-class fleet tanker of the Royal Fleet Auxiliary

fr:X-34